The city is the administrative division which falls under the division of the directorate in the urban, which is the centre of the provinces and the centre of districts as well as every urban population with a population of (5,000) or more people and a basic service or more available.

Here is a list of cities in Yemen:

 
Yemen, List of cities in
Cities